Candy Toy Guns and Television is the second and final studio album by American metal band 20 Dead Flower Children. It was originally released on June 24, 1997 by rapper Esham's label Overcore Records. On October 31, 2000, it was reissued by TVT Records. The original 1997 artwork, featuring a woman painted in bronze holding a gun to her mouth, was kept for TVT's reissue.

Reception

Erik Hage of AllMusic gave the album a negative one-and-a-half-star review, stating "20 Dead Flower Children's Candy, Toy Guns & Television is a rather uninspired, hard-edged foray into industrial/techno, with vocals that swing from Limp Bizkit-flavored rhyming to hardcore roaring." He also observed "This is an idiom that groups such as Linkin Park would subsequently navigate much more successfully (and parlay into financial success)."

Track listing

Personnel
20 Dead Flower Children
 Jason Garrison – drums
 Justin Starr – bass guitar
 Keith Lowers – guitar
 D-Hauz – vocals

References

1997 albums